Sinolinyphia is a monotypic genus of East Asian sheet weavers containing the single species, Sinolinyphia henanensis. It was first described by J. Wunderlich & S. Q. Li in 1995, and has only been found in China.

See also
 List of Linyphiidae species (Q–Z)

References

Linyphiidae
Monotypic Araneomorphae genera
Spiders of China